Boa Esperança (literally meaning "good hope" in Portuguese) may refer to the following places:

In Brazil

 Boa Esperança, Paraná, a municipality in Paraná state
 Boa Esperança, northeast of Pará, a municipality northeastern of Pará state
 Boa Esperança, southwest of Pará, a town southwest of Pará state
 Boa Esperança, Espírito Santo, a municipality in Espírito Santo state
 Boa Esperança, Minas Gerais, a municipality in Minas Gerais state

Others 

Boa Esperança is the name of a seaworthy  of a caravel, on display as a museum in the port of Lagos in the Algarve.

See also 
 Cape of Good Hope,  Portuguese name Cabo da Boa Esperança